Pongsiri Por Ruamrudee, was a former Thai Muay Thai kickboxer, popular during the golden era of Muay Thai.

Biography & career
Por Ruamrudee was born as Paiboon Ladnongkee (ไพบูลย์ ลัดหนองขี) in Tambon Mueang Phlapphla, Amphoe Huai Thalaeng, Nakhon Ratchasima province, northeastern Thailand.

He started fighter at the age of 12 with the support of his father, a fighting enthusiast. He fought at Rajadamnern Stadium for the first time, winning by knockout in the second round.

Por Ruamrudee fought for the first time in the event "Suek Onesongchai" of famous promoter Songchai Rattanasuban by knocking out the second round Tepparith Sor Naya-arm, This fight made him well-known among Muay Thai fans.

He was a small shape fighter, therefore he was a tough fighter who never backed down, pushing forward for the win with his aggressive fighting style.

Hence, Por Ruamrudee earned the nickname "Rambo" after the Sylvester Stallone movie character.

Every time before the match his staff waved a big black pirate flag and his trunks will also have a "skull & bones" symbol attached to it, as a unique calling card.

In 1988 his second fight against Pairojnoi "Bloody Steel" Sor Siamchai was elected "Fight of the Year" and became known as the fight of the century for Muay Thai. This fight is considered the milestone of modern Muay Thai, by making a record for the total entrance fee up to 3,200,000 baht for the first time.

Retirement
Por Ruamrudee retired at the age of 25. After retirement, he became a night club singer.

In early August 2016, he returned from retirement to face his old rival, Langsuan Panyuthaphum, in the special event at Rajadamnern Stadium. The result was draw.

He currently has a son who is a Muay Thai fighter like him, and he is a Muay Thai trainer for those interested at a gym in Taling Chan area, Bangkok.

Titles & honours
Lumpinee Stadium
 1988 Lumpinee Stadium Fight of the Year (vs. Pairojnoi Sor Siamchai on November 4th)
 1989 Fan Favorite Award
 1989 Lumpinee Stadium Fight of the Year (vs. Paruhatlek Sitchunthong)

Fight record

|- style="background:#fbb;"
| 1991-07-02 || Loss||align=left| Langsuan Panyuthaphum || Lumpinee Stadium  ||  Bangkok, Thailand  || KO (Knees)|| 4 ||
|-  style="background:#cfc;"
| 1991-05-10 || Win ||align=left| Tukatathong Por Pongsawang || Lumpinee Stadium || Bangkok, Thailand || Decision  || 5 || 3:00
|- style="background:#fbb;"
| ? || Loss||align=left| Jomwo Sittongchai || Lumpinee Stadium  ||  Bangkok, Thailand  || Decision || 5 || 3:00

|-  style="background:#fbb;"
| ? || Loss ||align=left| Yodawut Sor Totspaon || || Thailand || Decision  || 5 || 3:00
|-  style="background:#cfc;"
| 1990-09-25 || Win ||align=left| Chandet Sor Prantalay || Lumpinee Stadium || Bangkok, Thailand || Decision  || 5 || 3:00
|-  style="background:#fbb;"
| 1990-08- || Loss ||align=left| Orono Por Muang Ubon || Rajadamnern Stadium || Bangkok, Thailand || Decision  || 5 || 3:00
|-  style="background:#fbb;"
| 1990-07-20 || Loss ||align=left| Jaroensap Kiatbanchong || Lumpinee Stadium || Bangkok, Thailand || Decision  || 5 || 3:00
|-  style="background:#cfc;"
| 1990-07-06 || Win ||align=left| Michiaki Yamazaki || MAJKF || Tokyo, Japan || TKO (3 Knockdowns) || 2 || 2:08
|-  style="background:#fbb;"
| 1990-06-08 || Loss ||align=left| Chainoi Muangsurin || Lumpinee Stadium || Bangkok, Thailand || KO || 3 ||
|- style="background:#cfc;"
| 1990-05-18 || Win ||align=left| Jaid Seddak ||  MAJKF  ||  Tokyo, Japan  || Decision || 5 || 3:00
|- style="background:#cfc;"
| 1990-04-30 || Win ||align=left| Paruhatlek Sitchunthong ||  Lumpinee Stadium  ||  Bangkok, Thailand  || Decision || 5 || 3:00
|- style="background:#fbb;"
| 1990-04-10 || Loss||align=left| Langsuan Panyuthaphum || Lumpinee Stadium  ||  Bangkok, Thailand  || Decision || 5 || 3:00
|- style="background:#fbb;"
| 1990- || Loss||align=left| Chainoi Muangsurin || Lumpinee Stadium  ||  Bangkok, Thailand  || Decision || 5 || 3:00
|- style="background:#cfc;"
| 1990-02-18 || Win ||align=left| Michael Liewfat ||    ||  Amsterdam, Netherlands  || Decision || 5 || 3:00
|- style="background:#fbb;"
| 1990-01- || Loss ||align=left| Panphet Muangsurin || Lumpinee Stadium  ||  Bangkok, Thailand  || Decision  || 5||3:00
|- style="background:#fbb;"
| 1989-08-29 || Loss ||align=left| Boonlong Sor.Thanikul || Lumpinee Stadium  ||  Bangkok, Thailand  || KO  || 3||
|- style="background:#fbb;"
| 1989-07-25 || Loss ||align=left| Pairojnoi Sor Siamchai || Lumpinee Stadium  ||  Bangkok, Thailand  || Decision || 5 || 3:00

|- style="background:#fbb;"
| 1989-05-30 || Loss ||align=left| Karuhat Sor.Supawan || Lumpinee Stadium  ||  Bangkok, Thailand  || Decision || 5 || 3:00

|- style="background:#cfc;"
| 1989-05-02 || Win ||align=left| Toto Por Pongsawang ||  Lumpinee Stadium  ||  Bangkok, Thailand  || Decision || 5 || 3:00
|- style="background:#cfc;"
| 1989-02-11 || Win ||align=left| Toto Por Pongsawang ||   ||  Nakhon Ratchasima, Thailand  || Decision || 5 || 3:00
|- style="background:#fbb;"
| 1989-01-06 || Loss ||align=left| Paruhatlek Sitchunthong || Lumpinee Stadium  ||  Bangkok, Thailand  || Decision || 5 || 3:00
|- style="background:#fbb;"
| 1988-12-02 || Loss ||align=left| Langsuan Panyuthaphum || Lumpinee Stadium  ||  Bangkok, Thailand  || Decision || 5 || 3:00
|- style="background:#cfc;"
| 1988-11-04 || Win||align=left| Pairojnoi Sor Siamchai || Lumpinee Stadium ||  Bangkok, Thailand  || Decision || 5 || 3:00
|- style="background:#c5d2ea;"
| 1988-10-11 || Draw||align=left| Pairojnoi Sor Siamchai || Lumpinee Stadium ||  Bangkok, Thailand  || Decision || 5 || 3:00
|- style="background:#cfc;"
| 1988-08-30 || Win ||align=left| Seksan Sitchomthong || Lumpinee Stadium ||  Bangkok, Thailand  || Decision || 5 || 3:00
|- style="background:#cfc;"
| 1988-07-26 || Win ||align=left| Hippy Singmanee ||  Lumpinee Stadium ||  Bangkok, Thailand  || Decision || 5 || 3:00
|- style="background:#cfc;"
| 1988-06-28 || Win ||align=left| Toto Por Pongsawang ||  Lumpinee Stadium ||  Bangkok, Thailand  || Decision || 5 || 3:00
|- style="background:#cfc;"
| 1988-05-31 || Win ||align=left| Morakot Sor Tamarangsri || Lumpinee Stadium  ||  Bangkok, Thailand  || Decision || 5 || 3:00
|- style="background:#cfc;"
| 1988-05-03 || Win ||align=left| Pichit Sitbangprachan ||   Lumpinee Stadium ||  Bangkok, Thailand  || Decision || 5 || 3:00
|- style="background:#fbb;"
| 1988-04-08 || Loss||align=left| Kompayak Singmanee ||  Lumpinee Stadium ||  Bangkok, Thailand  || Decision || 5 || 3:00
|- style="background:#fbb;"
| 1988-03-04 || Loss||align=left| Panphet Maungsurin || Lumpinee Stadium  ||  Bangkok, Thailand  || KO || 2 ||
|- style="background:#cfc;"
| 1988-01-22 || Win ||align=left| Chainoi Muangsurin ||   ||  Bangkok, Thailand  || Decision || 5 || 3:00
|- style="background:#cfc;"
| 1987-12-08 || Win ||align=left| Kompayak Singmanee ||   ||  Bangkok, Thailand  || Decision || 5 || 3:00
|- style="background:#cfc;"
| 1987-11-13 || Win ||align=left| Amnatsak Sor.Sinsawat || Lumpinee Stadium  ||  Bangkok, Thailand  || KO (Punches) || 4 ||
|- style="background:#cfc;"
| 1987-10-07 || Win ||align=left| Yuenyong Kiatmongkol || Rajadamnern Stadium  ||  Bangkok, Thailand  || Decision || 5 || 3:00
|- style="background:#fbb;"
| 1987-07-31 || Loss ||align=left| Toto Por Pongsawang || Lumpinee Stadium  ||  Bangkok, Thailand  || KO || 2 ||
|- style="background:#cfc;"
| 1987-06-02 || Win||align=left| Daengnoi Por.Bunya || Lumpinee Stadium  ||  Bangkok, Thailand  || KO || 4||
|- style="background:#fbb;"
| 1987-05-01 || Loss ||align=left| Songchainoi Por.SomchitAir || Lumpinee Stadium  ||  Bangkok, Thailand  || KO || 2||
|- style="background:#cfc;"
| 1987-04-10 || Win ||align=left| Nuaphet Saksamut || Lumpinee Stadium  ||  Bangkok, Thailand  || Decision || 5 || 3:00
|- style="background:#fbb;"
| 1987-03-06 || Loss ||align=left| Panomrunglek Chor.Sawat || Lumpinee Stadium  ||  Bangkok, Thailand  || Decision || 5 || 3:00
|- style="background:#cfc;"
| 1987-02-10 || Win ||align=left| Komkai Kiatcharoen || Lumpinee Stadium  ||  Bangkok, Thailand  || Decision || 5 || 3:00
|- style="background:#cfc;"
| 1987-01-06 || Win ||align=left| Patcharin Sripatcharin ||   ||  Bangkok, Thailand  || Decision || 5 || 3:00
|- style="background:#cfc;"
| 1986-09-12 || Win ||align=left| Komkai Kiatcharoen || Lumpinee Stadium  ||  Bangkok, Thailand  || Decision || 5 || 3:00

|-  style="background:#cfc;"
| 1986-08-22 || Win||align=left| Danchailek Chor. Sawat || Lumpinee Stadium || Bangkok, Thailand || KO || 2 || 

|- style="background:#cfc;"
| 1986-02-10 || Win ||align=left| Komkai Kiatcharoen || Lumpinee Stadium  ||  Bangkok, Thailand  || Decision || 5 || 3:00 
|-
| colspan=9 | Legend:

References

Flyweight kickboxers
Featherweight kickboxers
Pongsiri Por Ruamrudee
Pongsiri Por Ruamrudee
Living people
1968 births
Muay Thai trainers